This article lists the winners and nominees for the NAACP Image Award for Outstanding Actor in a Comedy Series. It was known as the Outstanding Lead Actor in a Comedy Series until 2000. Currently Anthony Anderson holds the record for most wins in this category with eight.

Winners and nominees
Winners are listed first and highlighted in bold.

1970s

1980s

1990s

2000s

2010s

2020s

Multiple wins and nominations

Wins

 8 wins
 Anthony Anderson

 4 wins
 Steve Harvey
 Bernie Mac

 2 wins
 Bill Cosby
 LaVan Davis
 Kadeem Hardison
 Martin Lawrence

Nominations

 8 nominations
 Anthony Anderson
 Don Cheadle

 6 nominations
 Cedric the Entertainer
 Don Cheadle
 Donald Faison
 Bernie Mac

 5 nominations
 Steve Harvey
 Dulé Hill
 D. L. Hughley
 Dwayne Johnson
 Tyler James Williams

 4 nominations
 Cedric the Entertainer
 LaVan Davis
 Jamie Foxx
 George Lopez
 Damon Wayans

 3 nominations
 Flex Alexander
 André Braugher
 Terry Crews
 LL Cool J
 Kevin Hart
 Martin Lawrence
 Tracy Morgan

 2 nominations
 Terrence C. Carson
 Dave Chappelle
 Bill Cosby
 Donald Glover
 Robert Guillaume
 Kadeem Hardison
 Keegan-Michael Key
 Phil Morris
 Will Smith
 Malcolm-Jamal Warner
 Jaleel White

References

NAACP Image Awards